Deperetellidae is an extinct family of herbivorous odd-toed ungulates  containing the genera Bahinolophus, Deperetella, Irenolophus, and Teleolophus. Their closest living relatives are tapirs.

Members of Deperetillidae are medium to large-sized animals distinguished from other tapiroids by their high crowned and very bilophodont molars.

References

Prehistoric mammal families